Gonometa is a genus of moths in the family Lasiocampidae. The genus was erected by Francis Walker in 1855.

Species
Gonometa attenuata (Kenrick, 1914)
Gonometa badia (Aurivillius, 1927)
Gonometa bicolor (Dewitz, 1881)
Gonometa cassndra Druce, 1887
Gonometa christyi (Sharpe, 1902)
Gonometa effusa
Gonometa fulvida (Distant, 1897)
Gonometa griseocincta (Hampson, 1910)
Gonometa imperialis (Aurivillius, 1915)
Gonometa marginata
Gonometa negrottoi (Berio, 1940)
Gonometa nysa (Druce, 1887)
Gonometa podocarpi (Aurivillius, 1925)
Gonometa postica (Walker, 1855)
Gonometa regia (Aurivillius, 1905)
Gonometa robusta (Aurivillius, 1909)
Gonometa rufobrunnea (Aurivillius, 1922)
Gonometa sjostedti (Aurivillius, 1892)
Gonometa stalii
Gonometa tessmanni
Gonometa titan (Holland, 1893)

References

 
Lasiocampidae